Sataraš is a light vegetable stew made of bell peppers, tomatoes, onions and condiments.

See also
 Matbucha
 Peperonata

Bosnia and Herzegovina cuisine
Croatian cuisine
Montenegrin cuisine
Serbian cuisine